Sigismond Neukomm or Sigismund Ritter von Neukomm [after ennoblement as a knight] (10 July 1778, in Salzburg – 3 April 1858, in Paris) was an Austrian composer and pianist.

Neukomm first studied with the organist Weissauer and later studied theory under Michael Haydn and Leopold Mozart, though his studies at Salzburg University were in philosophy and mathematics. He became honorary organist at the Salzburg University church in 1792, and was appointed chorus-master at the Salzburg court theater in 1796. Neukomm was kapellmeister at St. Petersburg's German theatre from 1804 to 1809, and in the 1810s he spent time in Brazil, South America, where he popularized the works of Joseph Haydn and Wolfgang Mozart. He worked at D. João VI's court in Rio de Janeiro. His works had some currency in the nineteenth century: Johann Nepomuk Hummel's op. 123 is a Fantasie for Piano on themes by Hummel and von Neukomm. Boston's Handel and Haydn Society, for example, gave 55 performances of his oratorio David during the 1830s.

Neukomm's compositional output is large. With the older composer's approval he made arrangements of Haydn's works, including the oratorios The Seasons and The Creation. He wrote a clarinet quintet, several organ voluntaries, ten operas, incidental music for four plays, forty-eight masses, eight oratorios, and a large body of smaller works including vocal pieces, works for piano solo, and about 200 songs.

In 1814 Neukomm was responsible for erecting a tombstone to the memory of Haydn over his first grave in the Hundsturm cemetery in Vienna. The inscription included a puzzle canon composed by Neukomm himself. He had previously been one of Haydn's pupils, and was also in regular contact with the composer in the last months of his life.

The following year, his Requiem Mass  commissioned by Tayllerand, premiered for royalty and diplomats attending the Congress of Vienna on 21 January, the 22nd anniversary of the execution of Louis XVI in 1793.

References

Sources 
 Vincenzo Cernicchiaro. Storia della musica nel Brasile. Milano, Fratelli Riccioni, 1926.
 Don Randel. The Harvard Biographical Dictionary of Music. Harvard, 1996, p. 633.

External links 
 

1778 births
1858 deaths
18th-century Austrian people
18th-century classical composers
18th-century classical pianists
18th-century keyboardists
18th-century male musicians
19th-century Austrian people
19th-century classical composers
19th-century classical pianists
19th-century keyboardists
19th-century male musicians
Austrian classical composers
Austrian classical pianists
Austrian expatriates in Brazil
Austrian expatriates in France
Austrian expatriates in Russia
Austrian knights
Austrian male classical composers
Austrian opera composers
Male classical pianists
Male opera composers
Musicians from Salzburg
Pupils of Joseph Haydn
University of Salzburg alumni